The 2012 Westcoast Curling Classic was held from October 5 to 8 at the Royal City Curling Club in New Westminster, British Columbia as part of the 2012–13 World Curling Tour. The event was held in a round robin format, and the purse for the event was CAD$52,000, of which the winner, Kevin Martin, received CAD$14,000. Martin defeated Andrew Bilesky in the final with a score of 8–6, earning his third consecutive title and his seventh title overall at the Westcoast Curling Classic.

Teams
The teams are listed as follows:

Round robin standings
Final Round Robin Standings

Tiebreakers

Playoffs

References

External links

Westcoast Curling Classic
Westcoast Curling Classic
New Westminster